People's Stadium is a multi-use stadium in Victoria, Seychelles. It is currently used mostly for football matches, on club level by Rovers FC of the Seychelles Third Division. The stadium has a capacity of 7,000 spectators. It was the home of the Seychelles national football team until Stade Linité opened in 1992.

References

Football venues in Seychelles